Roman Shchegolev (also Tchegolev or Shegolev) is a Russian swimmer who won a gold medal at the 1995 European Aquatics Championships and two silver medals at the 1994 World Aquatics Championships, all in freestyle relays.

In 1995, he won national titles in the individual 200 m medley and 200 m freestyle events.

References

Living people
Russian male freestyle swimmers
Russian male swimmers
Medalists at the FINA World Swimming Championships (25 m)
World Aquatics Championships medalists in swimming
European Aquatics Championships medalists in swimming
Year of birth missing (living people)